John William Thain (3 February 1903 – December 1977) was an English professional footballer who played as an outside right in the Football League for Brentford, Grimsby Town and Newcastle United.

Career statistics

References

1903 births
English footballers
English Football League players
Brentford F.C. players
1977 deaths
Association football outside forwards
Newcastle United F.C. players
Peterborough & Fletton United F.C. players
Grimsby Town F.C. players
Southern Football League players
People from Pelaw
Footballers from Tyne and Wear
Association football midfielders